Sarah Kavanagh (born 3 June 1973) is an Irish former racing driver.

Career
Kavanagh made racing debut in 1992. She competed in the British Formula Vauxhall Championship in 1995. The following year, she entered two rounds in the British Formula Two Championship.

Kavanagh came to Japan in 1997 and participated in Formula Nippon (now called the Super Formula Championship) representing CERUMO. She became a hot topic as Formula Nippon's first female driver. However, she lost her qualifying time in the opening round at Suzuka by 14 seconds at the top and finished the race at 14th place. She retired in Round 2 at Mine, although she submitted a petition again and she was allowed to run in the finals. She offered to the team to suspend entry after the third race, saying, "I want to forgo participation until the environment for her continuation of the race is ready."

Kavanagh participated in Formula Nippon as the best place to aim for Formula One, but there are scenes of spinning and crossing with other cars on the course that Japan is not accustomed to, and there are scenes of bubbling and contact, and driving is immature and dangerous. There was also an indication that she also said she was too high in Formula Nippon than she thought she was, and she was keenly aware of her lack of ability. She was also too burdened with her funding because she was competing in Japan and England with several engineers and mechanics every race.

Her homepage has already been closed, and she now seems to be living a life unrelated to motorsport with her husband and children in southern France.

Racing career

Complete Formula Nippon results
(key) (Races in bold indicate pole position) (Races in italics indicate fastest lap)

References

1973 births
Living people
Irish female racing drivers
Formula Nippon drivers